Simon John Arthur Youl (born 1 July 1965) is a former professional tennis player from Australia.

Tennis career
Youl was an Australian Institute of Sport scholarship holder from 1981 to 1984.

Juniors
As a junior player, Youl formed a successful doubles partnership with his fellow Australian player Mark Kratzmann. In 1983, the pair won the Boys' Doubles titles at the French Open, Wimbledon and the US Open. In singles, he reached three slam finals, attaining a ranking as high as No. 5 in the junior world rankings in 1983.

Pro tour
As a professional player, Youl won two top-level singles titles (at Schenectady in 1989, and Singapore in 1992), and two tour doubles titles (Casablanca in 1990, and Bucharest in 1994). His best singles performances at Grand Slam events came in reaching the fourth round at Wimbledon in 1988 (lost to Stefan Edberg) and the Australian Open in 1990 (lost to Ivan Lendl).

Youl's career-high rankings were world No. 80 in singles and world No. 63 in doubles (both in 1992).

Retirement
He retired from the professional tour in 1994 (playing one Challenger event the following year). Since retiring as a player, he has worked as a tennis coach in Hobart, Tasmania.

ATP career finals

Singles: 2 (2 titles)

Doubles: 3 (2 titles, 1 runner-up)

ATP Challenger and ITF Futures finals

Singles: 7 (5–2)

Doubles: 12 (4–8)

Junior Grand Slam finals

Singles: 3 (3 runner-ups)

Doubles: 3 (3 titles)

Performance timelines

Singles

Doubles

Mixed doubles

References

External links 
 
 
 
 Tennis Tasmania

Australian male tennis players
Australian tennis coaches
People educated at Launceston Church Grammar School
French Open junior champions
Olympic tennis players of Australia
Sportspeople from Launceston, Tasmania
Tennis people from Tasmania
Tennis players at the 1984 Summer Olympics
US Open (tennis) junior champions
Wimbledon junior champions
1965 births
Living people
Australian Institute of Sport tennis players
Simon
Grand Slam (tennis) champions in boys' doubles
20th-century Australian people